Masjed Abu ol Fazl (also Romanized as Masjed Abū ol Faẕl) is a village in Abreis Rural District, Bazman District, Iranshahr County, Sistan and Baluchestan Province, Iran. At the 2006 census, its population was 320, in 68 families.

References 

Populated places in Iranshahr County